Ozarba catilina is a moth in the family Noctuidae (owlet moths) described by Herbert Druce in 1889. It is found in North America.

The MONA or Hodges number for Ozarba catilina is 9032.

References

Further reading
 
Lafontaine, J. Donald, & Schmidt, B. Christian (2010). "Annotated check list of the Noctuoidea (Insecta, Lepidoptera) of North America north of Mexico". ZooKeys, vol. 40, 1-239.

External links
Butterflies and Moths of North America

Noctuidae